Telega may refer to:

Telega, a Russian horse-drawn carriage
Telega, Prahova, a commune in Romania
Telega (river), Romania
Telega Tunggal No 1 - the first successful oil well drilled in Indonesia
An alternate spelling for Telaga caste